Vivienne Wallington (born 1937) is an Australian author of romance novels under her own name as well as the pen name Elizabeth Duke.

Biography
Wallington worked for many years as a librarian.  She wrote three children's books before beginning to write in the romance genre.  Nineteen of her novels were published under the Harlequin Romance line under the pseudonym Elizabeth Duke.  She now writes under own name for various Silhouette lines.  Romantic Times described her as "display[ing] a fine talent for storytelling as she creates dynamic characters and an intriguing conflict that will keep you guessing right up until the last page."

Wallington lives in Melbourne with her husband John.  They have two grown children.

Works

Novels
Somewhere (1983)
Butterfingers (1986)
Claiming His Bride (2001)
Kindergarten Cupids (2002)
In Her Husband's Image (2004)
The Last Time I Saw Venice (2005)

As Elizabeth Duke
Softly Flits a Shadow (1985)
Windarra Stud (1988)
Island Deception (1989)
Fair Trail (1990)
Wild Temptation (1991)
Whispering Vines (1992)
Outback Legacy (1993)
Bogus Bride (1993)
Shattered Wedding (1994)
Make-believe Family (1995)
To Catch a Playboy (1995)
Heartless Stranger (1996)
The Marriage Pact (1997)
Takeover Engagement (1997)
Taming a Husband (1997)
Look-Alike Fiancée (1998)
The Husband Dilemma (1998)
The Parent Test (1999)
The Outback Affair (2000)

Omnibus
In Her Husband's Image / Then There Were Three (2004) (with Lynda Sandoval)
Beauty Queen's Makeover / Last Time I Saw Venice (2005) (with Teresa Southwick)

See also
List of romantic novelists

References

Australian romantic fiction writers
Australian women novelists
Living people
1937 births
Women romantic fiction writers